Caroline Graham (born 1965) is a British broadcaster, known mostly for her work on Farming Today, on BBC Radio 4.

Early life
She went to school in Cumbria, becoming head girl at her comprehensive school. She studied Politics (BSc) at the University of Bristol. She grew up on a farm in Cumbria.

Career
She started at BBC Radio Cumbria in the 1990s, then moving to BBC Scotland in Glasgow from 1994–98, producing Woman's Hour in 1997. She has produced reports for other BBC Radio 4 programmes.

Farming Today
She works with Charlotte Smith on Farming Today.

Personal life
She lives in Cumbria. She married Peter Graham in 2000 in Cumbria.

References

External links
 Farming Today

1965 births
Alumni of the University of Bristol
BBC Radio 4 presenters
BBC radio producers
People from Cumbria
Women in agriculture
British women radio presenters
Women radio producers
Living people